Wong may refer to:

Name
 Wong (surname), a Chinese surname

Places
 Wong Chuk Hang, an area to the east of Aberdeen on Hong Kong Island
 Wong Chuk Hang Estate, a public housing estate in Wong Chuk Hang, Hong Kong
 Wong Chuk Hang Road, a major thoroughfare in southern Hong Kong
 Wong Chuk Hang station, a South Island line rail station on Hong Kong
 Wong Chuk Kok Tsui, a cape in north east New Territories, Hong Kong
 Wong Chuk Yeung (Sha Tin District), a village in Fo Tan, Sha Tin District of Hong Kong
 Wong Chuk Yeung (Tai Po District), a village in the Tai Po District of Hong Kong
 Wong Leng, section 9 of the Wilson trail in Pat Sin Leng Country Park, Hong Kong
 Wong Nai Chung Gap, a geographic gap in the middle of Hong Kong Island
 Wong Nai Chung Reservoir Park, a park in Wong Nai Chung Gap, Hong Kong
 Wong Nai Chung Road, a major road in Happy Valley, Hong Kong
 Wong Nai Tau, a village in Sha Tin District, Hong Kong
 Wong Nai Tun Tsuen, a village in the New Territories, Hong Kong
 Wong Shek, an area in the northern part of the Sai Kung Peninsula in Hong Kong
 Wong Shiu Chi Secondary School, a school in Tai Po, Hong Kong
 Wong Tai Sin, Hong Kong, an area in Wong Tai Sin District, Hong Kong
 Wong Tai Sin District, a district of Hong Kong
 Wong Tai Sin Temple (Hong Kong), a famous shrine in Hong Kong
 Wong Uk Tsuen or Wong Uk Village, villages in the New Territories, Hong Kong

Businesses
 WONG, a radio station (1150 AM) in Canton, Mississippi, USA
 Wong (supermarket), a supermarket chain in Peru
 Wong Fu Productions, an Asian American filmmaking group
 Wong Kei, a London Chinatown restaurant
 Wong Lo Kat, a Chinese herbal tea
 Mister Wong, a social bookmarking website
 Agencia de pronosticos "El Chino Wong". Mérida, Yucatan, Mexico

Fiction

Works
 Mr. Wong (web series), an internet television series
 Mr. Wong, Detective, a 1938 American crime film 
 The Mystery of Mr. Wong, a 1939 American crime film 
 Mr. Wong in Chinatown, a 1939 American crime film 
 Suzie Wong (franchise)
 The World of Suzie Wong, a 1957 novel by Richard Mason
 The World of Suzie Wong, a 1958 play by Paul Osborn
 The World of Suzie Wong (film), a 1960 British-American romantic drama film
 To Wong Foo, Thanks for Everything! Julie Newmar, a 1995 American comedy film
 Wong Fei Hung – Master of Kung Fu, a martial arts television series
 "Wong's Lost and Found Emporium", a 1985 episode of the New Twilight Zone
 Mr. Wong, a 1963 Filipino film starring Chiquito
 Wild, Wild Wong, a 1967 Filipino film
 Mr. Wong Strikes Again, a 1969 Filipino film
 Dynamite Wong and T.N.T. Jackson, a 1974 Filipino-American blaxploitation film
 Mr. Wong and the Bionic Girls, a 1977 Filipino film
 Mr. Wong Meets Jesse & James, a 1982 Filipino film

Characters
 Wong (character), manservant/mentor to Doctor Strange Sr./Jr. in Marvel Comics
 Wong (Marvel Cinematic Universe), the portrayal of the character in the Marvel Cinematic Universe
 Ada Wong, in the Resident Evil video game series
 Amy Wong, in the Futurama series
 Brad Wong, in Dead or Alive
 Cleopatra Wong, created by Bobby A
 Dr. Wong, in the Rick and Morty series
 Henry Wong or Lee Jiang-Liang, in the Digimon series
 Lee Wong, in the Beyblade series
 Maria Wong, in the show Braceface
 Mariah Wong, in the Beyblade series
 Mr. Wong (fictional detective), in short stories created by Hugh Wiley
 Nikki Wong, in the show 6teen
 Suzie Wong, in the Digimon series
 Mr. Wong, a character played by Filipino comedian Chiquito beginning in 1963.
 Mr. Wong, in Coronation Street
 Stanford Wong, in Lisa Yee's book Stanford Wong Flunks Big-Time
 Wong Leung, in the PlayStation 2 game The Bouncer

Other uses
 Jan Wong controversy, a 2006 Canadian media controversy
 Wong cilik, the general populace in the Javanese social hierarchy
 Wong Sun v. United States, a United States Supreme Court decision
 Wong Tai Sin (328–386), Chinese deity popular in Hong Kong associated with the power of healing

See also
 
 Won-G Bruny (born 1978), Haitian rapper
 Dr. Wong (disambiguation)
 Huang (disambiguation)
 Wang (disambiguation)
 Ng (name)